Convento de San José (Convent of St Joseph) is located in Jerez de la Frontera, Andalusia, Spain. It is governed by the Franciscan Poor Clares. The structure's interior has a courtyard and a church building dating to 1628.  In the 1970s, the dormitory was replaced with single rooms.

References

Convents in Spain
Franciscan monasteries in Spain
Buildings and structures in Jerez de la Frontera